Luis Luque, born Luis Antonio Pedro Barattero (June 12, 1956), is an Argentine film and television actor. He has made over 40 appearances in film and television in Argentina since 1982, when he appeared in Aprender a vivir.

Many of his films have received critical acclaim, including Corazón iluminado (1996), Buenos Aires plateada, and Cacería (2002), in which he played the lead role of Daniel. In 2004 he appeared as himself in 18-j.

Filmography
El robo del siglo (2020)
 La mujer de al lado (2019)
 Despido procedente (2017)
 Tiempo muerto (2016)
 Gato negro (2014)
 Ley primera (2012)
 El gato desaparece (2011)
 Pájaros volando (2010)
 Juntos para siempre (2010)
 Mis días con Gloria (2010)
 Más adelante (short film, 2010)
 Paco (2010)
 Zenitram (2010) .... Javier Medrano
 Mujeres Asesinas (2006)   Irma, la de los peces
 Mujeres Asesinas (2006)  Felisa, desesperada
 Tiempo de Valientes (2005) .... Alfredo Díaz
 El buen destino (2005)
 "Botines" (2005) (mini) TV Series
 Mujeres Asesinas (2005) Sandra, la gestora
 Velocidad funda el olvido, La (2005)
 Vigilador, El (2004) (TV) .... Vigilador
 Veneno da Madrugada, O (2004) .... Aristóteles Messina
 "Epitafios" (2004) (mini) TV Series .... Comisario Jiménez
 "Deseo, El" (2004) TV Series .... Flauta
 Rehen TV (2004) (TV) .... Monroy, Jorge
 24 hs en la city (2003) (TV)
 Ciudad del sol (2003) .... Tito
 Soy tu aventura (2003) .... Yaco
 "Los Simuladores" (1 episode, 2003)
 "Infieles" (2002) (mini) TV Series .... (episode "Mariposas")
 Cacería (2002) .... Daniel
 "099 Central" (2002) TV Series .... Franco Ledesma
 Un Día de suerte (2002/I) .... Hernando
 "Son amores" (2002) TV Series (uncredited)
 "Yago, pasión morena" (2001) TV Series .... Ramón (unknown episodes)
 Buenos Aires plateada (2000)
"Tiempofinal" (2000) TV Series (unknown episodes)
Ojos que no ven (2000) 
 "Buscas de siempre, Los" (2000) TV Series .... Raúl Benavides (Manosanta)
 Venganza, La (1999)
 "Condena de Gabriel Doyle, La" (1998) TV Series .... Gabriel Doyle
 "El Garante" (1997) (mini) TV Series
 Corazón iluminado(1996)
 Carlos Monzón, el segundo juicio (1996) .... Médico cirujano
 "Como pan caliente" (1996) TV Series
 Más allá del límite (1995) .... Luis
 "¡Hola Papi!" (1995) TV Series .... Gabriel
 Despertar de pasiones (1994)
 Terraza, La (1992) .... Criminal
 "Primer amor" (1992) TV Series .... Braulio
 "Oro y el barro, El" (1992) TV Series
 "Antonella" (1991) TV Series .... Gastón Cornejo Mejía
 Buenos Aires háblame de amor" (1991) TV Series .... Ramón
 Malevo (1990) .... Mateo
 "Rebelde" (1989) TV Series .... Andrés
 Dueño del sol, El (1987)
 Vínculos (1987) (TV) .... Fabián
 "Claudia Morán" (1986) TV Series .... Raúl Linares
 Sucedió en el internado (1985) .... Javier
 Cuarteles de invierno (1984)
 "Lucía Bonelli" (1984) TV Series
 "Dos vidas y un destino" (1984) TV Series
 "Aprender a vivir" (1982) TV Series

External links
 

1956 births
Argentine male film actors
Argentine male television actors
Living people